is the 17th single released from the Japanese pop band Orange Range.

Overview
Ikenai Taiyō is the 9th single to be released by Orange Range. The title song was used as the opening to the 2007 J-Drama version of Hanazakari no Kimitachi e. The single comes in two versions: a limited edition CD+DVD version and a CD only version. The CD+DVD version of the single comes with a digest of performances from Orange Range's fanclub live concerts. The single peaked at #2 on the Oricon daily charts and gained a spot of #3 on the weekly charts, still managing their highest sales in a year.

Tracks
CD Version
 Ikenai Taiyō (イケナイ太陽)
 Iketenai Taiyō (イケテナイ太陽)

DVD Version
 Danshi-ing session (男子ing session Dancing Boy Session)
 Winter Winner
 Miracle

Charts

Oricon chart (Japan)

References

Orange Range songs
2007 singles
Japanese television drama theme songs
2007 songs
Sony Music Entertainment Japan singles